The Institute of Marine Sciences (IMS) is a Turkish facility that focuses on marine science-related education and research. IMS was founded in 1975 on the Erdemli Campus at METU (Middle East Technical University) in Erdemli / Mersin. Institute's campus at Erdemli, houses laboratories, office buildings,  computing and remote sensing facilities, a library, an atmospheric tower, and other services. Housing for staff and students, and harbor facility are also located on the campus.

Location
Although the main campus of METU is in Ankara the institute was established in Mersin Province, a Mediterranean Sea |Mediterranean province of Turkey.

History
The institute was founded in 1975 as a part of Chemistry school. Two years later it moved to its current location which was allocated by the government. Up to present the institute had eight directors: Turgut İsmail Balkaş, Teoman Nuriddin Norman, Ümit Ünlüata, İlkay Salihoğlu, Şükrü Turan Beşiktepe, Ferit Bingel, Ahmet Kıydeş, and currently Barış Salihoğlu. The total number of MS graduates is 99 and the Phd gradıuates is 31. In its brief history, research accomplished by the institute has resulted both in vastly increasing our knowledge of the seas surrounding Turkey and in establishing a data base to help in the management of Marine Environment. During more than 30 years Institute had tens of projects

The  infrastructure 
The northern part is composed of mediterranean type scrub and an abandoned stone pit (Used during the construction of Mersin Harbor)

Education 

The institute has four main divisions: Chemical Oceanography, Marine Biology and Fisheries, Marine Geology and Geophysics, Physical Oceanography.

The programs are envisioned to provide scientists of future with through education and training in their fields. Special emphasis is given to studying the national marine environment, in keeping with the Institute of Marine Sciences’ objectives of developing and improving the marine resources of Turkey.

Students with B.S. degree (or equivalent) in one of the natural sciences or engineering, and a background including statistics and differential equations, calculus may apply.

Research 

Institute owns three research vessels: a 433 gross tons research vessel, RV/Bilim, which is utilized for ocean research, including fisheries, and two smaller vessels of 16 m length (the Lamas and the Erdemli) for daily trips in the near shore regions.

R/V Bilim 2

Institute of Marine Sciences' main research ship,  "Bilim 2's" designs were donated by the Scripps Institution of Oceanography, La Jolla, CA., which were at the time were blueprints of their R/V Alpha Helix . It was built in Istanbul, and launched in 1983. Steel hull, Length: 40.36 m, Beam: 9.47 m, Tonnage: 433 gross, 190 net tons, Draft: 3.80 m, Speed:  max,  cruising,  min, Range: , Propulsion: MWM diesel, variable-pitch propeller, Schafran bridge control unit, fuel capacity 120 m3. A Global Positioning System (GPS) is used for navigation. The vessel also has conventional radar with  range. The ship has central partial air conditioning and central heating.

The R/V Bilim 2 has quarters for a crew of 12, and can support a scientific party of 14 for a period of about 45 days at sea.

Physical and chemical data on board of the Bilim are obtained utilizing a Sea-Bird Model 9 CTD profiling system together with a General Oceanics rosette sampler having 12 bottles of 5 liter volume. The CTD and the rosette are operated using a Lebus hydrographic winch with a 2000 m cable. For on-board analyses an automatic Winkler titration system, an auto-analyzer, an in-situ spectrofluorometer, an irradiance meter as well as other instruments are available.

The vessel is fully equipped for fisheries and marine biological studies. Some of the major equipment for these investigations are a Norlau hydraulic trawl winch of 7.5 tons and 2 X 1500 m wire capacity, a hydraulic net winch of 6 ton capacity.

Marine geological investigations are carried out using an EG&G Uniboom shallow seismic system, side-scan sonars, and various corers. An underwater remotely operated camera (Mini Rover Benthos MK II) is also utilized in sea floor surveys.

Further reading 
Institute of Marine Sciences brief information page on official website

References

External links 
 Institute of Marine Sciences

Oceanographic organizations
Research institutes in Turkey
1975 establishments in Turkey
Middle East Technical University
Buildings and structures in Mersin Province